Caroline Wogan Durieux (January 22, 1896 – November 26, 1989) was an American printmaker, painter, and educator. She was a Professor Emeritus of Fine Arts at Louisiana State University, where she worked from 1943 to 1964.

Early life and education
She was born Caroline Spellman Wogan in New Orleans, Louisiana, on January 22, 1896; into a Creole family. At the age of 4, she began drawing and received art lessons from Mary Williams Butler (1873–1937), she was a local artist and a member of the faculty of art at Newcomb College at Tulane University. She worked in watercolor from the age of six and in 1908 created a portfolio of watercolors depicting New Orleans scenery. Most of these early works are now in The Historic New Orleans Collection.

She continued at Newcomb College of Tulane University in the Art School headed by Ellsworth Woodward. From her college days she was interested in satire and the use of humor in her imagery.  Durieux earned a Bachelor's in Design in 1916 and a Bachelor's in Art Education in 1917, and she pursued graduate studies at the Pennsylvania Academy of the Fine Arts led by Henry Bainbridge McCarter.

She returned to Louisiana after graduate school and in April 1920 married Pierre Durieux (1889–1949). Pierre worked in his family's business importing laces and dress goods from many Latin American countries.

Career 
Pierre's work led to a job in Cuba which Caroline described as a time of "quiet artistic growth that heightened her sense of color."  Caroline Durieux lived in the French Quarter in the mid-1920s, and was part of a circle of talented and creative individuals featured in a private publication, "Sherwood Anderson and Other Famous Creoles."  Her next-door neighbors included author, William Faulkner, and silver designer, William Spratling.

Spirituality and religion

Durieux was born into a mixed religion marriage at a time when that was taken more seriously than it is today. The Wogan family was Roman Catholic; the Spelmans were Episcopalian.  Caroline often referred to her father, Nicholas, as if he were officially excommunicated from the Catholic Church because of his marriage to her mother.

On Sundays Caroline would be taken to protestant services with her mother only to be whisked off to the "bells and smells" of the Catholic Cathedral's High Mass.

Religion is the central theme in Benediction, Priests,Acolytes,Chuch Interior, Death Masker, First Communion (2),Idle Angels, Insomne, Lot's Wife, Lady Godiva, Annunciation, On the Levee, Easter Egg, Iron Sharpeneth Iron, A Cult Leader Exhorts His Flock, Mother Carre and others.

Artist statement
"I cannot remember a time when I did not have a pencil in hand trying to put down on a slate, on wrapping paper or even on the woodwork visual ideas concerning my environment

To me art is not work. It is fun.

If I happen to give a measure of enjoyment to others as I entertain myself, so much the better. If not, well ... that's just too bad!"

Durieux in Cuba 

On April 19,1920 Caroline married childhood friend Pierre Durieux at her parents’ home at 1226 Louisiana Avenue in New Orleans. In October of 1920, the Durieux’s moves to Havana, Cuba where Pierre takes a position with General Motors.

In late December 1920, Caroline returned to New Orleans to give birth to the couple’s first and only child. She spends the next six months recuperating from postpartum complications at her parents' vacation home in Bay St. Louis, Mississippi. When Caroline returned to Cuba she and Pierre live in the downtime neighborhood of Vedado. Caroline worked briefly in a design firm but spent most of her time creating paintings, drawings and watercolors of her colorful surroundings. Caroline has said color, and most of her work from this period were still lifes, flowers and landscapes. 

At the request of her housekeeper, she became involved with the native women in the community, helping them devise a rudimentary method of birth control.

Mexico City 
In 1926, her husband Pierre was named chief representative of General Motors for all of Latin America, but Caroline stayed and worked in Mexico City. She received a letter of introduction to Diego Rivera from Tulane anthropologist, Franz Blom, which helped ease her transition into the local artist community. In 1929, curator Rene d'Harnoncourt, organized a solo exhibition of Caroline's oil paintings and drawings at the Sonora News Company. Rivera wrote a favorable review of his friend's exhibition, and then chose the occasion to paint her portrait.

Again, a promotion for Pierre marked an important development in his wife's career. This time they moved to New York City, where Caroline forged a lifelong friendship with art dealer, Carl Zigrosser. Zigrosser championed Durieux's career, first as director of the Weyhe Gallery, then as the curator of prints at the Philadelphia Museum of Art and including her in his many books. It was Zigrosser who recognized Durieux's talent and eye for satire and encouraged her adoption of lithography as a primary means of artistic expression.

In 1931, the Durieuxs again were transferred to Mexico City. Eager to learn more about lithography, Durieux enrolled in the Academy of San Carlos (now known as National Autonomous University of Mexico) to study with Emilio Amero. In 1934, Durieux experimented with etching, a technique she learned from Howard Cook. Caroline wrote to Carl Zigrosser: "All my etchings are harrowing. I think it is because the medium is such a precarious one-the least slip and all is lost. I can't be funny on a copper plate. I feel tragic the moment I think of doing an etching."

Back to New Orleans 
In 1937, Pierre Durieux was diagnosed with severe cardiac disease. His doctors ordered him to return to the United States, so the couple left Mexico reluctantly and returned to New Orleans. Later that year, Durieux was hired to teach in Newcomb College's art department for the fall term, where she focussed on ensuring that her students could draw before advancing to other classes.

In October 1937, Durieux exhibited her etching, Hunger, as a member of the Society of American Etchers (now known as the Society of American Graphic Artists). The exhibition, hosted at the Marcel Guiot Gallery, featured 50 members and artist.

Durieux took on a second job as director of the Federal Art Project (FAP) of the Works Progress Administration in February 1939. In a state where racial segregation remained legal until the 1960s, Caroline's Louisiana division of the FAP was the only project not to practice discrimination. Caroline always expressed great pride in that accomplishment: "I had a feeling that an artist is an artist and it doesn't make any difference what color he or she is."  Robert Armstrong Andrews, associate director of the national office, praised Durieux's work: "It is my observation that the people in Louisiana have more concern with the potentialities of the Negro and less for his limitations than the people of any other state.”

From 1943 to 1964, she taught in the art department at Louisiana State University.

In the 1950s, Durieux experimented in printmaking; working on perfecting her electron printmaking technique (with radioactive ink) and she produced the first color cliché verre prints.

In 1976, Caroline Durieux was the first living artist to be honored with a retrospective of her work at The Historic New Orleans Collection.

In 1980, she was awarded the Women's Caucus for Art Lifetime Achievement Award.

Mardi Gras 
Caroline Durieux, John McCrady and Ralph Wickiser collaborated on a 1948 book, Mardi Gras Day, published by Henry Holt. Each artist contributed 10 artworks as illustrations for the book.  The ten lithographs that Durieux contributed for this book are less satirical than much of her work. When asked about this, Durieux said that Mardi Gras was inherently self-satirical and therefore she decided to present it as is.

Durieux was a fixture at the Mardi Gras Day open house hosted by Lyle Saxon in the St. Charles Hotel. Dressing in costume was a requisite for admission to the party and some of Durieux’s images for the book were of attendees.

In 2018 the Hermes parade included a float titled Caroline Durieux that was inspired by Swine Maskers one of the artist’s lithographs from the book.  The other nine lithograph were: Carnival Ball, Coach Dogs, Death Masker,Five Girls, Night Parade, Queen of the Carnival, Rex, Six o’clock, TruckRiders.

Good Will Ambassador 
In August 1940, President Franklin D. Roosevelt named Nelson A. Rockefeller to head the Office of the Coordinator of Inter-American Affairs (CIAA), a new federal agency whose main objective was to strengthen cultural and commercial relations between the U.S and Latin America, in particular Brazil, in order to route Axis influence and secure hemispheric solidarity.  Rockefeller appointed Caroline Durieux to accompany an exhibition from the Museum of Modern Art to Buenos Aires, Montevideo and Rio.

The art exhibitions being sent to Mexico were imagined differently by many. Were they purely cultural? Were they intended to improve relations between our countries or were they intended to purely advance our strategic political and defense goals?  Having spent so much of her career in Cuba and Mexico, Durieux had the language skills and political connections necessary to understand the sensitivities of the target audience.  She relayed her concerns back to DC that the promotional poster was too US-centric to be embraced widely and that the accompanying catalog was confusing because works not being exhibited in a given city were illustrated prominently in the all-inclusive book.

Durieux was both savvy and social and she used those skills to make the events successful. She involved local artists, encouraged their input and charmed them with her art talks and symposia. She facilitated acquiring the supplies needed at local level to enable communities to express their visions. What started out as a tone-deaf good intention turned into a healthy dialogue about art among nations.

In the 1950s, Durieux’s work in electron printmaking was used as a tool in the Cold War. The Atomic Energy Commission sends an exhibition of Durieux’s works around the world to promote the premise that atomic energy can be used to create art rather than weapons.

Innovation 
Caroline Durieux was never content with what she had achieved. She was intrigued with experimentation and new frontiers.  The Zigrosser book on Durieux's was published n 1949, By 1951 she is experimenting with faculty friends Naomi and Harry Wheeler, a botanist, with ink coated microbes. In 1952 Durieux creates the first electron print using radioactive ink.  In the book The Appeal of Prints, Carl Zigrosser hails the technique as an advance in printmaking. 

By 1954 Durieux introduces color into the electron printing process with the assistance of faculty friends on the Chemistry faculty, Dr. Olen Nance and Dr. John F. Christman

By 1957, Durieux applies for patent on electron printing. That same year she and Dr. Christman revive the 19th century technique, cliche verre using photographic paper in lieu of glass. Ultimately they devise a way to print color cliche verres using the new technique.

The new techniques were slow to be adopted because many were reluctant to work with the low level of radiation.  However, Durieux's experimental work was well received by critics and museums alike.

Death and legacy 
Durieux died on November 26, 1989 in Baton Rouge, Louisiana. Her papers are held at Louisiana State University and the Archives of American Art.

In 2010, a retrospective, "Caroline Durieux: A Radioactive Wit", was exhibited at the LSU Museum of Art. In 2018 she was profiled in a short film on New Orleans public TV, WYES, as part of the station's "Tricentennial Moments" campaign honoring the city.

The largest collections of Durieux works may be seen in the following museums; the Philadelphia Museum of Art, the Historic New Orleans Collection, Louisiana State Museum, the Ogden Museum of Southern Art, LSU Museum of Art, Louisiana Art and Science Museum , and the Meridian Museum of Art

Bibliography 
 
 
 Caroline Durieux and her Art Conquer Washington,A review of the artist's exhibition at the June 1 Gallery in Washington, DC, July 1979 June 1 Jottings

References

Further reading
 
 
 Retif, Earl (1990) Caroline Wogan Durieux (1896-1989). Newcomb Under the Oaks, Vol.14, Spring 1990
 Retif, Earl and Main, Sally, Curators(2008),From Society To Socialism, The Art of Caroline Durieux" (2008), Newcomb Art Gallery of Tulane University.ISBN 0966859561 Saxon, Lyle (author) and Durieux, Caroline (artist), Gumbo Ya-Ya: A Collection of Louisiana Folk Tales (1945), ISBN 9780517019221
 Poesch, Jessie J., Printmaking in New Orleans (2006), The Historic New Orleans Collection, ISBN 9781578067688
 Retif, Earl, The Sharpest of Needles, Innovative 20th Century Printmaking by Caroline Durieux, Summer 2008, The Tulanian, Volume 80, pages 28-35
 Kraeft, June and Norman, Durieux and her Art Conquer Washington, June 1 Jottings, July 1979
 Ittmann, John, editor, Shoemaker, Innis, Weschler, James, Williams, Lyle, Mexico and Modern Printmaking, Philadelphia Museum, 2006, ISBN 9780876331949.
 Saltpeter, Harry, About Caroline Durieux: A Southern Girl Whose Pictures Have No Languor, But An Icy Bite, Coronet, June 1937.50
 Wickiser, Ralph, Durieux,Caroline, and McCrady, John, Mardi Gras Day, New York: Henry Holt, 1948
 Zigrosser, Carl, The Appeal of Prints, Kennett Square, PA. KNA Press, 1970
 Jones, Howard Mumford, Books Considered, The New Republic, March 1978, p.34-35
 Retif, Earl, In Memoriam Caroline Durieux. 1896-1989, From the New Orleans Museum of Art, Journal of the Print World 13 No. 2, Spring 1990, 30.
 Glassman, Elizabeth, and Symmes, Marilyn F.,Cliche-Verre, Hand Drawn, Light Printed: A Survey of the Medium from 1839 to the Present, The Detroit Institute of the Arts, 1980
Phagan, Patricia, editor,The American Scene and the South - Painings and Works on Paper 1930-1946, Georgia Musem of Art-University of Georgia,1996,p.110-115
Kraeft, June and Norman, Great American Prints 1900-1950, 138 Lithographs Etchings and Woodcuts, Dover Publications 1984, ISBN 0-486-24661-2 #40
Faulkner, William and Spratling, William, Sherwood Anderson & Other Famous Creoles; A Gallery of Contemporary New Orleans, Pelican Press, 1926
Symmes, Marilyn, Paths to the Press, Printmaking and American Women Artists,1910-1960, Kansas State University,2006
Miller, Robin, Setting an Example: Early Female ArtistsCarve Out Their Space Louisiana, The Advocate,March 2022
Miller, Robin, A Radioactive Wit Exhibition Celebrates Work Caroline Durieux, The Advocate, August 2010
Franich, Megan, Works of Art, Arts for Work: Caroline Wogan Durieux,the Works Progress Administration and the U.S.State Department (2010),University of New Orleans Thesis and Diaaertation
Williams, Lynn Barstis, Imprinting the South, Printmakers and Their Images of the Region, 1920s-1940s, University of Alabama Press (2007), ISBN 9780817315603
Barnwell, Janet Elizabeth, "Narrative patterns of racism and resistance in the work of William Faulkner" (2002). LSU Doctoral Dissertations
McCash, Doug. “Conflicted Caroline, Ridiculing the Road Not Taken.” New Orleans Times Picayune. March 28, 2008
Beall, Karen and Fern, Alan and Zigrosser, Carl, American Prints in the Library of Congress, A Catalog of the Collection (1970), Johns Hopkins University Press
Johnson, Una E., American Prints and Printmakers, (1970), Knopf Doubledy, ISBN 9780385149211
Landau, Ellen, Artists for Victory, (1983), Library of Congress, ISBN 0844404322
Gambone, Robert L, Art and Popular Religion in Evangelical America,1915-1942, University of Tennessee Press (1989), p.102,112,119-124,126,134,ISBN 0-87049-588-7
Schenck, Kimberly, Cloche-Verre: Drawing and Photography, Topics in Photography Preservation, 1995, Vol. 6 Article 9, p.112-118
Borden, Emily, Egner & Koutroulis , Wayne State University eMuseum (2023)
Seaton, Elizabeth G.,Paths to Press (2006) ISBN 1890751138
Pfohl,Katie , Mexico in New Orleans: A Tale of Two Americas , LSU Press (2016) ISBN9780807163344
Ulloa-Herrera, Olga, THE U.S. STATE, THE PRIVATE SECTOR AND MODERN ART IN SOUTH AMERICA 1940-1943, A Dissertation Submitted to the Graduate Faculty of George Mason University in Partial Fulfillment of The Requirements for the Degree of Doctor of Philosophy Cultural Studies (2014)
Laney, Ruth, The Thrill of the Hunt, Country Roads Magazine (2016)
Paine, Frances Flynn and Abbot, Jere, Exhibition Catalog on Diego Rivera, Museum of Modern Art, Includes illustration of Rivera's portrait of Caroline Durieux, Dec 23, 1931 - Jan 27,1932 (1931)
Durieux, Caroline, Satirical Paintings and Drawings by Caroline Durieux, Virginia Museum of Fine Arts (1944)
Sadlier, Darlene J., Good Neighbor Cultural Diplomacy in world War II: The Art of Making Friends, Indiana University
Retif, Earl, In Memoriam, Caroline Durieux (1896-1989) Rare Works by the Artist at the New Orleans Museum of Art, Journal of the Print World (1990)
Rivera, Diego, On The Work of Caroline Durieux, Mexican Folkways, Sonora News Company (1929)
Beals Carleton, The Art of Caroline Durieux, Mexican Life (1934)
Pope, John, Caroline Durieux's World, New Orleans States-Item, November 1978
Hoffman, Louise C., Caroline Durieux, A Portrait of the Artist, The Historic New Orleans Collection Quarterly, (Spring 1992)
Durieux, Caroline, An Inquiry into the Nature of Satire, Twenty-four Satirical Lithographs'', Master of Arts Thesis, Department of Fine Arts (May 1949)

External links
 Video: Caroline Durieux, Tricentennial Moment (2018) by WYES-TV (PBS)
 Salzer, Adele Ramos, Caroline Durieux Interview, Friends of the Cabildo Oral History Program, Louisiana State Museum (1976)

1896 births
1989 deaths
Artists from New Orleans
Louisiana State University faculty
American lithographers
H. Sophie Newcomb Memorial College alumni
Pennsylvania Academy of the Fine Arts alumni
20th-century American women artists
American women printmakers
20th-century American printmakers
Artists from Louisiana
Women lithographers
American women academics
Louisiana Creole people
20th-century lithographers